Galenic formulation deals with the principles of preparing and compounding medicines in order to optimize their absorption. Galenic formulation is named after Claudius Galen, a 2nd Century AD Greek physician, who codified the preparation of drugs using multiple ingredients. Today, galenic formulation is part of pharmaceutical formulation. The pharmaceutical formulation of a medicine affects the pharmacokinetics, pharmacodynamics and safety profile of a drug.

See also
 Formulations
 Pharmaceutical formulation
 ADME
 Pharmacology
 Medicinal chemistry
 Pesticide formulation

Medicinal chemistry